Tetracentron sinense is a flowering plant native to Asia and the sole living species in the genus Tetracentron. It was formerly considered the sole species in the family Tetracentraceae, though Tetracentron is now included in the family Trochodendraceae together with the genus Trochodendron.

Range and habitat
It is native to southern China, northern Vietnam and the eastern Himalaya (eastern Nepal, Bhutan, Northeast India, and northern Myanmar), where it grows at altitudes of  along streams and forest margins in broad-leaved evergreen and mixed evergreen-deciduous forests.

Morphology
The spur shoots bear one leaf each year, slowly lengthening with each subsequent year.

The fruit is a follicle  diameter, containing 4–6 seeds.

Tetracentron and Trochodendron share the very unusual feature of lacking vessel elements in the wood, something not typical in angiosperms. This has long been considered a very primitive character, resulting in the classification of these two genera in a basal position in the angiosperms; however, molecular phylogenetics research by the Angiosperm Phylogeny Group and others has shown that these two genera are not basal angiosperms, but related basal eudicots.  This suggests that the absence of vessel elements in this group is a secondarily evolved character, not a primitive one.

References

External links
Flora of China: Tetracentron and Tetracentraceae
Plant Kaleidoscope: Tetracentron

Trochodendrales
Trees of Bhutan
Trees of China
Flora of East Himalaya
Trees of Myanmar
Trees of Nepal
Trees of Vietnam
Taxa named by Daniel Oliver